Oblo is a poorly attested, unclassified, and possibly extinct language of northern Cameroon. It is, or was, spoken in a tiny area including Gobtikéré, Ouro Bé, and Ouro Badjouma, in Pitoa, Bénoué Department.

Eldridge Mohammadou located Olbo around Bé, at the confluence of the Benue River and Kebi River, in Bibemi commune. However, ALCAM (2012), following Ethnologue, reports that Oblo was spoken near Tcholliré in Mayo-Rey department, Northern Region. Oblo is known only from eight words collected by Kurt Strümpell in the early 1900s.

Oblo has been classified as one of the Adamawa languages, but it has not been included in recent classifications. It might be best left unclassified altogether.

Further reading
Mohammadou, Eldridge. 1983. Peuples et Royaumes du Foumbina. In African Languages and Ethnography XVII. Morimichi Tomikawa, ed. Japan: Institute for the Study of Languages and Cultures of Asia and Africa (ILCAA).
Mohammadou, Eldridge. 1979. Les Yillaga de la Bénoué: Ray ou Rey-Bouba. Paris: CNRS.
Mohammadou, Eldridge. 1980. Garoua: Tradition historique d’une cité peule du Nord-Cameroun. Paris: CNRS.
Mohammadou, Eldridge. 1983. Peuples et Etats du Foumbina et de l’Adamawa. (Traduction d’études par K. Strümpell et von Briesen). Yaoundé.
Strümpell, Kurt, and Bernard Struck. 1910. “Vergleichendes Wörterverzeichnis der Heidensprachen Adamauas”. Zeitschrift für Ethnologie 42 (314):444–448. (“Vocabulairecomparé des langues des païens de l’Adamaoua”)
Struempell, Kurt. 1912. “Die Geschichte Adamauas nach mündlichen Ueberlieferungen”. Mitt. Geogr. Gesellschaft in Hamburg 26:46–107.

References

Adamawa languages
Unclassified languages of Africa
Languages of Cameroon